Ida M. Graeber Curran (1863 – January 24, 1948) was an American journalist and editor.

Early life
Ida M. Graeber was born in Waterbury, Vermont. When a mere child, her family moved to Boston and afterwards to Woburn, Massachusetts. 

She early showed a marked talent for literary work, and at school won her highest standing in rhetoric and literature. This proficiency in composition gained for her one of the four class honors in the Woburn high school when she graduated.

Career
Ida M. Curran contributed largely to the Grattan Echo.

Household duties compelled Curran to withdraw for a time from literary labors, but in 1888 she once more became associated with newspaper work, her articles appearing in the Woburn City Press, of which journal she assumed entire control in 1890. The publication belonged to her husband, who was a busy lawyer, and who wanted to sell the paper, but Curran offered to take charge of The Press herself.

Curran was a member of the New England Woman's Press Association. 

She was an accomplished violinist and an amateur actress.

Personal life
Ida M. Curran married the publisher of the Grattan Echo and later owner of the Woburn City Press, Francis A. Curran. 

She died on January 24, 1948, in Fresno, California.

References

1863 births
1948 deaths
19th-century American writers
People from Waterbury, Vermont
19th-century American newspaper editors
19th-century American women writers
Women newspaper editors
Wikipedia articles incorporating text from A Woman of the Century